Clark House or Clark Farm or Clark Mansion or variations may refer to:

Alabama
Willis G. Clark House, Citronelle, Alabama, listed on the National Register of Historic Places (NRHP) in Mobile County

Arizona
Clark Memorial Clubhouse, Clarkdale, Arizona, listed on the NRHP in Yavapai County
Clark Mansion (Clarkdale, Arizona), a contributing property in NRHP-listed Clarkdale Historic District (Clarkdale, Arizona)
J.M. Clark House, Flagstaff, Arizona, listed on the NRHP in Coconino County
Clark House (Prescott, Arizona), listed on the NRHP in Yavapai County

Arkansas
Clark–King House, Mountain View, Arkansas, listed on the NRHP in Stone County
Clark House (Malvern, Arkansas), listed on the NRHP in Hot Spring County

California
William S. Clark House, Eureka, California, listed on the NRHP in Humboldt County
Dr. George C. Clark House, Fullerton, California, listed on the NRHP in Orange County
Mary Andrews Clark Memorial Home, Los Angeles, California, listed on the NRHP in Los Angeles County
Clark House (Pasadena, California), a residence designed by Richard Neutra, built in 1957

Connecticut
Capt. John Clark House, Canterbury, Connecticut, listed on the NRHP in Windham County
Clark Farm Tenant House site, East Granby, Connecticut, listed on the NRHP in Hartford County
Perkins–Clark House, Hartford, Connecticut, listed on the NRHP in Hartford County
Clark Homestead, Lebanon, Connecticut, listed on the NRHP in New London County
Andrew Clark House, Lisbon, Connecticut, listed on the NRHP in New London County
Avery Clark House, Southington, Connecticut, listed on the NRHP in Hartford County

Delaware
Clark–Pratt House, Kenton, Delaware, listed on the NRHP in Kent County

District of Columbia
Morrison and Clark Houses, listed on the NRHP in Northwest Washington, D.C.

Florida
Clark–Chalker House, Middleburg, Florida, listed on the NRHP in Clay County

Idaho
Clark House (Clarksville, Idaho), listed on the NRHP in Kootenai County

Illinois
Dr. Clark House, Sycamore, Illinois, a contributing property in Sycamore Historic District

Indiana
Wellington A. Clark House, Crown Point, Indiana, listed on the NRHP in Lake County
Orin Clark House, Garrett, Indiana, listed on the NRHP in DeKalb County
Julian–Clark House, Indianapolis, Indiana, listed on the NRHP in Marion County

Iowa
Clark House (Iowa City, Iowa), listed on the NRHP in Johnson County
Gerome Clark House, Milford, Iowa, listed on the NRHP in Dickinson County
Alexander Clark House, Muscatine, Iowa, listed on the NRHP in Muscatine County
Clark–Blackwell House, Muscatine, Iowa, listed on the NRHP in Muscatine County
Clark Round Barn, Tyrone, Iowa, listed on the NRHP in Monroe County

Kansas
Doney–Clark House, Kingman, Kansas, listed on the NRHP in Kingman County
Clark–Robidoux House, Wallace, Kansas, listed on the NRHP in Wallace County

Kentucky
McBrayer–Clark House, Lawrenceburg, Kentucky, listed on the NRHP in Anderson County
John Clark House (Lexington, Kentucky), listed on the NRHP in Fayette County
Gov. James A. Clark Mansion, Winchester, Kentucky, listed on the NRHP in Clark County

Maine
Edmund and Rachel Clark Homestead, China, Maine, listed on the NRHP in Kennebec County

Massachusetts
Clark Houses, Natick, Massachusetts, listed on the NRHP in Middlesex County
Clark House (Newton, Massachusetts), also known as the Rev. Francis E. Clark House, listed on the NRHP in Middlesex County
Clark–Northrup House, Sherborn, Massachusetts, listed on the NRHP in Middlesex County
Hancock-Clark House, Lexington, Massachusetts, listed on the NRHP in Middlesex County 
Sanderson–Clark Farmhouse, Waltham, Massachusetts, listed on the NRHP in Middlesex County
Clark–Eames House, Washington, Massachusetts, listed on the NRHP in Berkshire County

Michigan
Clark–Stringham site, Jackson, Michigan, listed on the NRHP in Jackson County

Mississippi
John Clark House (Clarksdale, Mississippi), listed on the NRHP in Coahoma County
Hughes–Clark House, Fayette, Mississippi, listed on the NRHP in Jefferson County
O'Keefe–Clark Boarding House, Ocean Springs, Mississippi, listed on the NRHP in Jackson County
Mollie Clark House, Pickens, Mississippi, listed on the NRHP in Holmes County

Missouri
James Beauchamp Clark House, Bowling Green, Missouri, listed on the NRHP in Pike County
George Boardman Clark House, Cape Girardeau, Missouri, listed on the NRHP in Cape Girardeau County
C. M. and Vina Clark House, Montrose, Missouri, listed on the NRHP in Henry County

Montana
Charles W. Clark Mansion, Butte, Montana, listed on the NRHP in Silver Bow County
W. A. Clark Mansion, Butte, Montana, listed on the NRHP in Bow County
Clark–Cardwell House, Lewistown, Montana, listed on the NRHP in Fergus County
Jennie Clark House, Stevensville, Montana, listed on the NRHP in Ravalli County

Nebraska
Isaac Newton Clark House, Sutton, Nebraska, listed on the NRHP in Clay County

New Jersey
William Clark House (Newark, New Jersey), listed on the NRHP in Essex County
Seventeenth Century Clark House, Rahway, New Jersey, listed on the NRHP in Union County
Benjamin Clark House, Wenonah, New Jersey, listed on the NRHP in Gloucester County

New York
Clark–Keith House, Caledonia, New York, listed on the NRHP in Livingston County
Clark–Lester House, Lancaster, New York, listed on the NRHP in Erie County
Clark Farm Complex, Lima, New York, listed on the NRHP in Livingston County
Starr Clark Tin Shop, Mexico, New York, listed on the NRHP in Oswego County
Ezra Clark House, Millerton, New York, listed on the NRHP in Dutchess County
Clark House (Poughkeepsie, New York), listed on the NRHP in Dutchess County
Clark–Dearstyne–Miller Inn, Rensselaer, New York, listed on the NRHP in Renssalaer County
Peyton Clark Cottage, Saranac Lake or St. Armond, New York, listed on the NRHP in Essex County
Clark House (Syracuse, New York), listed on the NRHP in Onondaga County
Clark House (Ticonderoga, New York), listed on the NRHP in Essex County
Hulet Clark Farmstead, Westtown, New York, listed on the NRHP in Orange County

North Carolina
John Hector Clark House, Clarkton, North Carolina, listed on the NRHP in Bladen County

North Dakota
Clark House (Goodrich, North Dakota), listed on the NRHP in Sheridan County

Ohio
Dr. John Clark House, Berea, Ohio, known also as Buehl House
Jared Clark House, Broadview Heights, Ohio, listed on the NRHP in Cuyahoga County
Dr. Clark House (Mechanicsburg, Ohio), listed on the NRHP in Champaign County
Whitney Clark House, Wellington, Ohio, listed on the NRHP in Lorain County
Ansel Clark House, Wellington, Ohio, listed on the NRHP in Lorain County
Wells–Clark–Strouss House, Youngstown, Ohio, listed on the NRHP in Trumbull County

Oklahoma
Mahoney–Clark House, Lawton, Oklahoma, listed on the NRHP in Comanche County

Oregon
Robert F. and Elizabeth Clark House, Baker, Oregon, listed on the NRHP in Baker County
Clark–McConnell House, Grants Pass, Oregon, listed on the NRHP in Josephine County
Clark–Norton House, Grants Pass, Oregon, listed on the NRHP in Josephine County
Frank Chamberlain Clark House, Medford, Oregon, listed on the NRHP in Jackson County
Burke–Clark House, Portland, Oregon, listed on the NRHP in Multnomah County
Elizabeth Clark House, Oregon City, Oregon, listed on the NRHP in Clackamas County

Pennsylvania
Sen. Joseph O. Clark House, Glen Campbell, Pennsylvania, listed on the NRHP in Indiana County
Silas M. Clark House, Indiana, Pennsylvania, listed on the NRHP in Indiana County

Tennessee
Douglass–Clark House, Gallatin, Tennessee, listed on the NRHP in Sumner County
Langston Clark Barn, Maryville, Tennessee, listed on the NRHP in Blount County
Willard–Clark House, Maryville, Tennessee, listed on the NRHP in Blount County
Weakley–Truett–Clark House, Nashville, Tennessee, listed on the NRHP in Davidson County
Henry A. Clark House, Wartrace, Tennessee, listed on the NRHP in Bedford County

Texas
Clark–Whitton House, Lufkin, Texas, listed on the NRHP in Angelina County
Robert Clark House, Victoria, Texas, listed on the NRHP in Victoria County
Clark House (Victoria, Texas), listed on the NRHP in Victoria County

Utah
Anderson–Clark Farmstead, Grantsville, Utah, listed on the NRHP in Tooele County
Peter Clark House, Park City, Utah, listed on the NRHP in Summit County
Clark–Taylor House, Provo, Utah, listed on the NRHP in Utah County
Isaac C. and Dorothy S. Clark House, Salt Lake City, Utah, listed on the NRHP in Salt Lake County
Jensen–Clark House, Sandy, Utah, listed on the NRHP in Salt Lake County

Virginia
Reuben Clark House, listed on the NRHP in Hampton, Virginia

Washington
Clark Mansion (Spokane, Washington), also known as the Patsy Clark Mansion, listed on the NRHP in Spokane County

Wisconsin
William Clark House (Baraboo, Wisconsin), listed on the NRHP in Sauk County
Clark–Brown House, Beloit, Wisconsin, listed on the NRHP in Rock County
Jonathan Clark House, Mequon, Wisconsin, listed on the NRHP in Ozaukee County

See also
Clarke House (disambiguation)
Dr. Clark House (disambiguation)
John Clark House (disambiguation)
William Clark House (disambiguation)